Lieutenant General Xavier Bout de Marnhac (born 7 July 1951 in Trier, West Germany) is a French military commander and former head of the Kosovo Force (KFOR) and of EULEX.

Sources
 Biography at setimes.com

External links
Career timeline from French Government website

1951 births
Living people
French military personnel
United Nations Mission in Kosovo
French lieutenant generals
École Spéciale Militaire de Saint-Cyr alumni
Commandeurs of the Légion d'honneur
Commanders of the Ordre national du Mérite
Recipients of the Cross for Military Valour